Design Issues is a peer-reviewed academic journal covering design history, theory, and criticism. The journal typically includes theoretical and critical articles, book reviews, and illustrations. Design Issues was established in 1984 and is published online and in hard copy by MIT Press.

Abstracting and indexing 
The journal is abstracted and indexed in:

References

External links 
 

Arts journals
Engineering journals
Publications established in 1984
MIT Press academic journals
Quarterly journals
English-language journals